Kelly Masterson is an American screenwriter, playwright and writer who lives in New York. He wrote the screenplay for the film Before the Devil Knows You're Dead, for which he is perhaps best known. Before moving to New York to stage several of his early plays, he studied Theology at the University of California, Davis.

He tried to get the script for Before the Devil Knows You're Dead, made seven years before director Sidney Lumet agreed to direct it. In describing his script he has said:

"I don't know. It was winter, and I was depressed I guess when I was writing it. I'm fascinated by the folly of human nature. I love characters who we understand and sympathize with, but we just shake our heads at how stupidly they act. This probably comes from my theology background but I love the big themes of good and evil and how we're such a combination of both. We try to chart a path that's on the side of good, but we all have evil impulses in us."

Subsequent to his success with Before the Devil Knows You're Dead, he has worked in several media including stage plays, film and television. Masterson's play Edith. about Woodrow and Edith Wilson premiered at the Berkshire Theater Festival in 2012. He also collaborated with Korean director Bong Joon-ho on the critically acclaimed Snowpiercer, an English-language production that received a North American release in 2014.

Masterson wrote the teleplay for the television movie, Killing Kennedy, which aired in November 2013 on the National Geographic Channel.

Filmography
 Before the Devil Knows You're Dead (2007)
 Snowpiercer (2013)
 Killing Kennedy (2013)
 Good People (2014)

References

External links
 

American dramatists and playwrights
American male screenwriters
Year of birth missing (living people)
Living people
University of California, Davis alumni
American male dramatists and playwrights